Ardchronie is a hamlet in the Highland Council area of Scotland. Upper Ardchronie is on the hill above Ardchronie.

References

Populated places in Ross and Cromarty